TD Ameritrade is a stockbroker that offers an electronic trading platform for the trade of financial assets including common stocks, preferred stocks, futures contracts, exchange-traded funds, forex, options, mutual funds, fixed income investments, margin lending, and cash management services. The company receives revenue from interest income on margin balances, commissions for order execution, and payment for order flow.

The company was founded as Ameritrade in 1971. In 2006, it acquired the United States operations of TD Waterhouse from Canadian holding company TD Bank Group and was renamed TD Ameritrade, with TD Bank Group holding a significant ownership stake in the resulting combined company. In September 2017, the company acquired the main brokerage business of Scottrade, and converted all of their client assets and accounts to TD Ameritrade; the Scottrade Bank subsidiary along with associated checking and savings accounts were folded into TD Bank Group's U.S. subsidiary TD Bank, N.A., making the Scottrade brand cease to exist. In 2020, TD Bank Group sold TD Ameritrade to Charles Schwab Corporation. TD Ameritrade's investment services and accounts are now scheduled to be fully absorbed and integrated with those of Schwab by the year 2023, including but not limited to former legacy Scottrade brokerage accounts. Its operations are in the process of being moved to the Charles Schwab headquarters in Westlake, Texas.

History

In 1975, the Securities and Exchange Commission banned the practice of fixed brokerage commissions and Joe Ricketts and three partners opened First Omaha Securities, Inc. in Omaha, Nebraska.

In 1983, Ameritrade Clearing Inc. was established as a central counterparty clearing broker.

In 1988, the company introduced the first quote and order entry system via the push-button telephone.

In 1995, the company acquired K. Aufhauser & Company, Inc., the first firm to offer an electronic trading platform.

In January 1996, TransTerra's Accutrade launched "Accutrade for Windows", an electronic trading platform.

In September 1996, the company merged with TransTerra.

In March 1997, the company became a public company via an initial public offering.

In February 2001, the company acquired TradeCast, which had approximately 60 broker-dealer, hedge fund and money management customers, for $67.3 million.

In July 2001, the company acquired National Discount Brokers for $154 million, adding $6.3 billion in client assets.

In September 2002, the company acquired Datek.

In June 2003, the company acquired MyDiscountBroker.com.

In 2004, the company acquired Bidwell in January, BrokerageAmerica in February, and JB Oxford and Company in October.

In January 2006, the company acquired the United States brokerage business branded as TD Waterhouse from Toronto-Dominion Bank. The newly combined company was renamed TD Ameritrade, with the Toronto-Dominion Bank owning 40%.

In February 2008, the company acquired accounts from Fiserv.

In May 2008, CEO Joe Moglia announced he would be vacating the CEO position and would become Chairman. He was succeeded as CEO by COO Fredric Tomczyk, who was formerly Vice Chair of Corporate Operations at Toronto-Dominion Bank.

In January 2009, the company acquired Thinkorswim, a producer of software for active traders, for $606 million in cash and stock.

In 2013, the company opened a new $250 million headquarters in Omaha.

In 2016, Tomczyk retired as CEO and succeeded by Tim Hockey, who had previously headed the TD Canada Trust retail banking division of Toronto-Dominion Bank.

In September 2017, the company acquired Scottrade, based in St Louis, Missouri, making St. Louis the second-largest hub for the company. The transition of client accounts occurred in February 2018. 

In April 2018, TD Ameritrade and Havas placed the first advertisement inserted within the bitcoin blockchain.

In July 2019, CEO Tim Hockey announced his departure from TD Ameritrade in early Q1 2020.

In October 2019, TD Ameritrade reduced most online trades to being commission free.

In July 2020, Joe Moglia retired from his role as Chairman of the Board of TD Ameritrade.

On October 6, 2020, Charles Schwab Corporation acquired TD Ameritrade just over three years after their acquisition of Scottrade. 

On January 28, 2021, the company and other trading platforms restricted the trade of certain heavily shorted stocks such as GameStop, BlackBerry, AMC, Koss Corporation, and Nokia.

On February 21, 2023 , Charles Schwab started the process of moving TD Ameritrade customers to Schwab. This procedure is expected to be rolled out in batches. TD Ameritrade customers will be able to carry over their documents and relevant information, including 10 years worth of statements.

Legal actions

Security breaches
In November 2007, the company reported that hackers gained access to most of its clients' names, Social Security numbers, dates of birth, addresses, phone numbers, and trading activity. In 2011, after being sued in a class action, the company settled by agreeing to compensate customers that were victim to identity theft between $50 and $2,500 each. The settlement was criticized for netting the attorneys almost as much money as the victims. In 2020, customer login information was being sold on the dark web.

Auction rate securities scandal
In 2009, TD Ameritrade settled a lawsuit alleging it had marketed auction rate securities as short-term investments. The settlement included a $456 million payment and the buyback of the securities, compensating investors for losses.

Customer losses in reserve money funds
The company recommended to its customers to invest cash holdings in a money market fund that was an affiliate of the Reserve Primary Fund and the fund gained approximately $1 billion in assets as a result of such marketing by the company. The company received commissions from the fund for steering customers. In September 2008, during the financial crisis of 2007–2008, as a result of its holdings in securities of Lehman Brothers, the fund was forced to break the buck and $1 billion in cash equivalents of TD Ameritrade clients were frozen. The company was accused of having a conflict of interest as a result of commissions that it received, for having poor marketing ethics, and for misrepresenting the safety of the investment. Fredric Tomczyk, President of the company, argued that the contract with the Reserve Fund was a standard contract and that "an investment firm has to make money in some way." The company was named in class action lawsuits by its customers and the U.S. Securities and Exchange Commission launched an investigation into its marketing practices. In 2008, the company agreed to reimburse its customers for up to a 3% loss in the Reserve Primary Fund, or up to $50 million. In 2011, the company settled the SEC case and agreed to pay 1.2¢ per share of the Reserve Yield Plus Fund that was held by its customers, or $10 million in total. The Reserve Yield Plus made its final distribution in 2016 and investors received 97 to 98 cents per share in addition to compensation from TD Ameritrade.

India 
In September 2022, the Reserve Bank of India (RBI), India's central bank, released a list of 34 forex trading online platforms, in which TD Ameritrade was also listed as illegal platform in India.

Sponsorships
The company owned the naming rights to the baseball field TD Ameritrade Park Omaha, for which it would pay an average of $1 million a year for a twenty-year contract period starting in 2011. After the acquisition by Charles Schwab Corporation, they retained ownership of the naming rights; the baseball venue was subsequently renamed Charles Schwab Field Omaha.

References

External links

1971 establishments in Nebraska
1997 initial public offerings
2020 mergers and acquisitions
American companies established in 1971
American corporate subsidiaries
Companies formerly listed on the Nasdaq
Companies based in the Dallas–Fort Worth metroplex
Electronic trading platforms
Financial services companies established in 1971
Investment banks in the United States
Online financial services companies of the United States
Online brokerages
Toronto-Dominion Bank